The 2003 New Zealand Film Awards were held on 8 December 2003 in Auckland. After there had been no New Zealand film awards in 2002, previous organiser the New Zealand Academy of Film and Television Arts had originally announced its intention to again host a film awards for 2003, but later withdrew, claiming insufficient sponsorship to stage the awards. However, a group from the film industry, led by the New Zealand Film Commission and government agency New Zealand Trade and Enterprise, raised enough sponsorship to host the awards. 

Feature film Whale Rider dominated the awards with nine wins, and short film Two Cars, One Night won three of the four short film prizes.

Nominees and winners

There were 16 feature film categories, five digital feature categories and four short film categories. This was the first time that digital film was acknowledged in a New Zealand film award.

Feature film

Best Film
Whale Rider
Kombi Nation
Nemesis Game

Best Director
Niki Caro, Whale Rider
Grant Lahood, Kombi Nation
Jesse Warn, Nemesis Game

Best Actor
Waihoroi Shortland, The Maori Merchant of Venice
Jason Whyte, Kombi Nation
Rawiri Paratene, Whale Rider

Best Actress
Keisha Castle-Hughes, Whale Rider
Michelle Langstone, For Good
Kate Elliott, Toy Love

Best Supporting Actor
Cliff Curtis, Whale Rider
Te Rangihau Gilbert, The Maori Merchant of Venice
Grant Roa, Whale Rider

Best Supporting Actress
Vicky Haughton, Whale Rider
Miranda Harcourt, For Good
Veeshayne Armstrong, The Maori Merchant of Venice

Best Juvenile Performer
Mana Taumanu, Whale Rider
Anneke-Lee Gough, For Good

Best Screenplay
Niki Caro, Whale Rider
Grant Lahood, Jason Whyte, Loren Horsley, Gentiane Lupi, Genevieve McClean, Kombi Nation
Jesse Warn, Nemesis Game 

Best Cinematography
Aaron Morton, Nemesis Game
Davorin Fahn, The Maori Merchant of Venice
Leon Narbey, Whale Rider

Best Editing
Bruce Lange, Nemesis Game
Margot Francis, Toy Love
David Coulson, Whale Rider

Best Original Score
Lisa Gerrard, Whale Rider
Clive Cockburn and Hirini Melbourne, The Maori Merchant of Venice
Victoria Kelly and Joost Langeveld, Toy Love

Best Contribution to a Soundtrack
Tim Prebble, Dave Whitehead, Gethin Greagh, The Locals
Frank Ilfman, Nemesis Game
Tim Prebble, Toy Love

Best Design
Peter Cosco, Nemesis Game
Guy Moana, The Maori Merchant of Venice
Grant Major, Whale Rider

Best Costume Design
Kirsty Cameron, Whale Rider
Gavin McClean, The Maori Merchant of Venice
Shelley Mansell, Nemesis Game

Best Makeup
Barbara Barkey, Nemesis Game
Annie Single, The Maori Merchant of Venice
Denise Kum, Whale Rider

Lifetime Achievement Award
Don Selwyn

Digital Feature

Best Digital Feature
Christmas, Leanne Saunders and Gregory KingOrphans and Angels, Harold Brodie
Woodenhead, Florian HabichtBest PerformanceDarien Takle, Christmas
Emmeline Hawthorne, Orphans and Angels
Stephen Lovatt, This Is Not A Love Story

Best Script
Gregory King, Christmas
Harold Brodie, Orphans and Angels
Keith Hill, This Is Not A Love Story

Best Technical Contribution
Caroline Falgan, Art Director, Christmas
Ian Beale, Cinematography, Orphans and Angels
Christopher Pryor, Director of Photography and co-editor, Woodenhead

Special Jury Prize
Christopher Brown for his role in Orphans and Angels

Short film

Best Short Film
Beautiful, Adam StevensThe French Doors, Steve Ayson
Two Cars, One Night, Taika WaititiBest PerformanceRangi Ngamoki, Two Cars, One Night
Peter Feeney, The Platform
Jason Hoyte, Beautiful

Best Script
Taika Waititi, Two Cars, One Night
Daniel Strand, Playing A Role
Wiremu Grace, Turangawaewae

Best Technical Contribution
Adam Clarke, Cinematography, Two Cars, One Night
Michael Lucas, Digital Visual Effects, Kitty
Dave Whitehead, Music Composition, The Platform

References

New Zealand film awards
Film awards
New Zealand
December 2003 events in New Zealand